Koodal Nagar (கூடல் நகர்) is a neighbourhood in Madurai district of Tamil Nadu state in the peninsular India. Koodal Nagar is well connected by roads that lead to Alanganallur area where Bull fight play is famous. Koodal Nagar area is one of the 28 wards that were included after the year 2011, to Madurai Municipal Corporation which has 100 wards now that had 72 wards before the year 2011.

Location 
Located at an altitude of about 166 m above the mean sea level, the geographical coordinates of Koodal Nagar are 9°57'51.5"N, 78°05'47.8"E (i.e., 9.964300°N, 78.096600°E).

Neighbourhoods 
Madurai, Goripalayam, Sellur, Arappalayam, Vilangudi and  Thathaneri are some of the important neighbourhoods of Koodal Nagar.

Transport

Road transport 
So many Madurai City Corporation buses ply via. Koodal Nagar. Periyar Bus Terminus which is one of the key bus terminii in Madurai is located at about 7 km from Koodal Nagar. Koodal Nagar is also served by another bus stand viz., Arappalayam Bus Terminus which is just 4 km from it. One more Bus stand namely Anna Bus Terminus is situated at about 8 km from Koodal Nagar.

Rail transport 
Koodal Nagar has a railway station in which some of the trains entering Madurai city stop for a while for the passengers to detrain. Bharat Gaurav train bound for Amritsar and back departs and arrives from Koodal Nagar. Madurai Junction railway station which is busy round the clock is situated at about 6.5 km from Koodal Nagar.

Air transport 
From Koodal Nagar, Madurai Airport at Avaniapuram is located at about 19 km.

Education

Schools 
Keswick Public School and St. Joseph Matriculation Higher Secondary School are some of the important schools in Koodal Nagar.

Politics 
Koodal Nagar comes under Madurai Central Assembly constituency, with the winner of its legislative assembly elections held in the year 2021, as Palanivel Thiagarajan. It also comes under Madurai Lok Sabha constituency for which the parliamentary elections were held in the year 2019 with the winner as S. Venkatesan.

References 

Neighbourhoods and suburbs of Madurai